Felix Cash (born 31 March 1993) is an English professional boxer who has held the Commonwealth middleweight title since 2019 and the British middleweight title since April 2021.

Professional career 

Cash made his professional debut on the undercard of Anthony Joshua vs. Dominic Breazeale on 25 June 2016, scoring a four-round points decision (PTS) victory against Yailton Neves at The O2 Arena in London.

After winning his first 9 fights, 6 by stoppage, he faced Stephen Danyo for the vacant WBC International Silver middleweight title on 28 October 2018 at the Copper Box Arena, London. Cash won by a shutout unanimous decision (UD) victory over 10 rounds with all three judges scoring the bout 100–90.

In his next fight he fought Rasheed Abolaji for the vacant Commonwealth middleweight title on 2 February 2019, at The O2 Arena. Halfway through the first round, Cash dropped Abolaji with a jab. He made it to his feet by the referee's count of six and upon doing so, was met with a combination of punches to the head and body. With 27 seconds remaining of the round, Cash landed a right hand to the chin of his opponent. As Abolaji was on his way down, Cash landed a right uppercut, causing Abolaji to fall face-first to the canvas. He rose to his feet before the count of ten but immediately stumbled backwards, prompting referee Marcus McDonnell to call a halt to the contest, awarding the Commonwealth title with a first-round technical knockout (TKO).

The first defence of his Commonwealth title came on 2 November 2019, against Jack Cullen at the Manchester Arena on the undercard of Katie Taylor's world title challenge against Christina Linardatou. Cash landed a right hand to the head which stunned Cullen in the opening round. After taking another right hand, Cullen began backing up, only to be on the receiving end of a three punch combination which sent him to the canvas. In the final 30 seconds of round seven, after taking several powerful punches ending with a left hook, Cullen took a knee to receive an eight count from the referee. In round eight, after Cullen was on the receiving end of several unanswered blows, referee Howard Foster called a halt to the contest with 1 minute and 46 seconds remaining in the round, handing Cash an eighth-round TKO victory.

His second defence—and only fight of 2020—came against former British middleweight champion and world title challenger Jason Welborn on 14 August, at the Matchroom Sport headquarters in Brentwood, Essex. In a fight which saw Cash receive a point deduction in the fifth round for punching below the belt, he went on to win by TKO in the final 30 seconds of the round after Welborn's corner threw in the towel following two knockdowns.

After nearly a year out of the ring, it was announced on 17 March 2021 that Cash's next fight would take place on 24 April, against reigning British middleweight champion Denzel Bentley. Cash stunned his opponent with a left hook in the opening round, causing Bentley to stumble backwards into a corner. In the third, Cash landed a right hand to force Bentley into the ropes. After a series of follow-up right hands from Cash, referee Victor Loughlin stepped in to call a halt to the contest, awarding Cash the British title via TKO at 1 minute 23 seconds of the third round. In the post-fight interview, Cash stated his intentions to fight for the European title, saying, "I want the third [belt] now, I want the European, then we'll move on. We've got a lot of big names out there. You have got Chris Eubank, you have got Liam Williams and a few others."

Professional boxing record

References

External links

Living people
1993 births
Sportspeople from Chertsey
English male boxers
Middleweight boxers
Commonwealth Boxing Council champions
British Boxing Board of Control champions